The 1959 Colorado State Rams football team represented Colorado State University in the Skyline Conference during the 1959 NCAA University Division football season.  In their fourth season under head coach Don Mullison, the Rams compiled a 6–4 record (5–2 against Skyline opponents), finished second in the Skyline Conference, and were outscored by opponents by a total of 147 to 123.

The team's statistical leaders included Bill Wade with 197 passing yards, Wayne Schneider with 457 rushing yards, and Al Fortune with 99 receiving yards.

Schedule

References

Colorado State
Colorado State Rams football seasons
Colorado State Rams football